Gazoryctra hyperboreus is a moth of the family Hepialidae first described by Heinrich Benno Möschler in 1862. It is known in North America, from New England and Quebec west to the foothills of Alberta.

References

Moths described in 1862
Hepialidae
Moths of North America